Leucine-rich repeat-containing protein 50 is a protein that in humans is encoded by the LRRC50 gene.

Function 

Leucine-rich repeat-containing protein 50 is cilium-specific and is required for the stability of the ciliary architecture. It is involved in the regulation of microtubule-based cilia and actin-based brush border microvilli.

Clinical significance 

Mutations in the LRRC50 gene are associated with primary ciliary dyskinesia.

References

Further reading

External links
 GeneReviews/NCBI/NIH/UW entry on Primary Ciliary Dyskinesia